Gilang Ginarsa (born 14 May 1988 in Jakarta) is an Indonesian professional footballer who plays as a right-back for Liga 1 club Persikabo 1973.

Hounors

Clubs
Pelita Jaya U-21
 Indonesia Super League U-21: 2008-09
Arema F.C.
 Menpora Cup: 2013
 Indonesian Inter Island Cup: 2014/15

References

External links
 Gilang Ginarsa at Soccerway
 Gilang Ginarsa at Liga Indonesia

1988 births
Living people
Sportspeople from Jakarta
Indonesian footballers
Indonesian Premier Division players
Liga 1 (Indonesia) players
PPSM Magelang players
Pelita Jaya FC players
Persepam Madura Utama players
Arema F.C. players
Madura United F.C. players
Sriwijaya F.C. players
PSIS Semarang players
Mitra Kukar players
Semen Padang F.C. players
Persikabo 1973 players
Association football fullbacks